On the Line ( is a Swiss German/German short film. Directed by Reto Caffi, the film is also the recipient of multiple international awards, including a Brooklyn Festival Award. Written by Caffi and Naomi Westerman, it stars Roeland Wiesnekker, Roland Bonjour, Janic Halioua, and Julie Bräuning.

Plot
A security guard named Rolf (Wiesnekker) spends his days trying to prevent shoplifting at a department store. He also makes time to interact with the bookshop's clerk Sarah, whom he has a crush on. One night as he is on the train, he sees Sarah enter with another man. Believing this man to be her boyfriend, Rolf is filled with jealousy. After the pair have an argument, Sarah exits the train. Shortly after, a group of teens attack the man while Rolf decides not to intervene and gets off at the next stop. The victim, who is later revealed to be Sarah's brother, dies as a result of the attack. Filled with regret about not intervening to prevent the death, Rolf develops a closer relationship with Sarah. The pair spend a night drinking when Sarah has a breakdown over her brother's death. Rolf consoles her but ultimately does not reveal his role in her brother's death.

Awards and nominations

References

External links
 

 

2007 short films
2007 films
2000s German films